Andreas Rühmkorf (born 4 April 1966) is a former Austrian footballer who played as a forward.

External links
 

1966 births
Living people
Austrian footballers
SV Stockerau players
SKN St. Pölten players
Floridsdorfer AC players
SC Ostbahn XI players
Association football forwards
Austrian Football Bundesliga players
2. Liga (Austria) players